Ritschel is a German surname. Notable people with the surname include:

Georg Ritschel (1616–1683), Bohemian Protestant minister and educator
Manfred Ritschel (born 1946), German footballer
William Frederic Ritschel (1864–1949), German-born American painter
Leonardo Crivellaro Ritschel
(1997-present day), Brazilian young turist

See also
Ernst Friedrich August Rietschel (1804–1861), German sculptor

German-language surnames